Shona Moss (born 12 April 1969) is a Canadian sailor. She competed in the Europe event at the 1992 Summer Olympics.

References

1969 births
Living people
Sportspeople from Kitchener, Ontario
Canadian female sailors (sport)
Olympic sailors of Canada
Sailors at the 1992 Summer Olympics – Europe
Pan American Games gold medalists for Canada
Pan American Games medalists in sailing
Medalists at the 1991 Pan American Games
Sailors at the 1991 Pan American Games